Reginald James Knipe (30 September 1905 – 3 May 1969) was an Australian rules footballer who played with Fitzroy in the Victorian Football League (VFL).

Notes

External links 

1905 births
1969 deaths
Australian rules footballers from Victoria (Australia)
Fitzroy Football Club players